The secretary of tourism (Filipino: Kalihim ng Turismo) is the head of the Department of Tourism and is a member of the president's Cabinet.

The current secretary is Christina Frasco, who assumed office on June 30, 2022.

List of secretaries of tourism

References

External links
Department of Tourism Philippines website
DFPC website

 
Tourism